Captain  William Rainsborough (11 June 1587 – 16 Feb 1642) was an English Captain and Vice-Admiral in the Royal Navy, English ambassador to Morocco and politician who sat in the House of Commons from 1640 to 1642.

Naval expeditions 

On the orders of Charles I of England, Rainsborough led a successful naval expedition against the Barbary corsairs of Salé in North West Morocco in June 1637.  His exploits were hailed in a court masque designed by Inigo Jones For his services to end white slavery Rainsborough was offered a hereditary knighthood, which he declined, and was presented with a Gold Chain and Medal by Charles I.
Captain Rainsborough's Emblem was a Saracen's head crest. The Saracen Head as interpreted as 'the head of the foreigner'; the foreigner being the much-feared pirates of the north African coast. Usually referred to as Turks, these marauders were in the white slavery business. This emblem represented Captain Rainsborough's success at ending White Slavery against the Barbary pirates in Morocco in 1637.

MP for Aldeburgh Suffolk 1640

In April 1640, Rainsborough was elected Member of Parliament for Aldeburgh in the county of Suffolk in the Short Parliament. He was re-elected for Aldeburgh in November 1640 for the Long Parliament and held the seat until his death in 1642.

Death 1642

Rainsborough died in 1642 and was buried at St Katharine's by the Tower on 16 February 1642.

Father of Thomas Rainsborough

Rainsborough married Judith Horton, daughter of Renold and Joane Horton. Their sons Thomas and William were political and religious radicals, both of whom fought for Parliament during the Wars of the Three Kingdoms.

Gallery

References

Further reading
 
 

Ambassadors of England to Morocco
1642 deaths
Royal Navy admirals
17th-century Royal Navy personnel
English MPs 1640 (April)
English MPs 1640–1648
17th-century English diplomats
Year of birth unknown
1587 births
People from Whitechapel
Military personnel from London